A pion is a type of subatomic particle.

Pion may also refer to:

 PION, gene; see Protein pigeon homolog
 2S7 Pion, self-propelled gun
 Pión District, in Peru
 Posterior ischemic optic neuropathy
 Pio Pion (1887–1965), Italian entrepreneur